trading as Monolith Soft, is a Japanese video game development studio originally owned by Namco (later Bandai Namco) until being bought out by Nintendo in 2007. The company was founded in 1999 by Tetsuya Takahashi with the support and cooperation of Masaya Nakamura, the founder of Namco. Their first project was the Xenosaga series, a spiritual successor to the Square-developed Xenogears. Multiple Square staff would join Takahashi at Monolith Soft including Hirohide Sugiura and Yasuyuki Honne.

In addition to the Xenosaga series, Monolith Soft worked on other projects including Baten Kaitos and Namco × Capcom, the precursor to their later Project X Zone series, along with assisting on projects from other developers. While several of its games have released on the PlayStation 2, the majority of its games have released on Nintendo platforms. As of 2019, Monolith Soft operates four studios. Its main studio is in Meguro, Tokyo that produces the company's original video game properties; the secondary Nakameguro GS and Osaki Studio similarly based in Tokyo, and a studio in Kyoto with mainly artists as its employees, which acts as an assisting developer for both Monolith Soft and for some Nintendo games.

The design approaches of Monolith Soft have shifted over its lifetime, with early games such as Xenosaga and Baten Kaitos being distinguished by a narrative-heavy approach, while later games have focused more on gameplay. The company's stated goals are to create projects with wide creative freedom and to allow younger developers to contribute to these projects. The company is also notable for its focus on promoting a comfortable working environment with little to no overtime in contrast to the majority of other Japanese game developers, alongside collaborating with other studios and companies.

History

Origins
Monolith Soft was founded by Tetsuya Takahashi, a developer who had previously worked at Nihon Falcom and later at Square, in which the latter was merged into Enix in 2003 to form Square Enix. While at Square, he and his wife Kaori Tanaka (also known as Soraya Saga) would contribute to the development of multiple games including entries in the Final Fantasy series. Following their work on Final Fantasy VI, Takahashi and Tanaka created a proposal for Final Fantasy VII; while deemed too dark for the Final Fantasy series, they were allowed to develop it as their own project titled Xenogears. Takahashi's ambition and drive prompted Final Fantasy creator Hironobu Sakaguchi, then Executive Vice President at Square, to appoint him as director. Takahashi also wrote the script with Tanaka. Following the release of Xenogears, Takahashi became dissatisfied with Square's business approach at the time, which prioritized their major intellectual properties including Final Fantasy. This left Takahashi with no funding or creative room to develop further independent projects or continue his planned Xenogears series.

In 1999, Takahashi talked with Hirohide Sugiura, who had likewise worked at Square and was beginning to feel frustrated due to a lack of creative freedom. After discussing the matter, the two decided to create their own company and pursue projects they wanted to create. When planning their new company, Takahashi and Sugiura decided that they needed a publisher with substantial market presence to help them rather than being an independent studio. Takahashi and Sugiura approached multiple companies for support, but most of the companies they contacted outright rejected their offer as they believed that Monolith Soft should be an independent company. However, Namco were interested in investing into Monolith Soft as a dedicated subsidiary, whilst handling logistics and marketing so that the core staff could focus on game development. An important supporter of Monolith Soft was Namco's founder Masaya Nakamura, who shared many of Takahashi and Sugiura's goals and ideals. Monolith Soft is noted as being one of a group of video game companies—alongside Sacnoth, Love-de-Lic and Mistwalker—founded by Square staff who had worked on notable games produced during the 1990s. The company was officially founded on 1 October 1999 by Takahashi, Sugiura, and Yasuyuki Honne, who had worked at Square on both the Chrono series and with Takahashi on Xenogears. The company's offices were originally based in Yokohama.

2000s

Namco era
Monolith Soft's first project was Xenosaga Episode I, a role-playing game (RPG) for the PlayStation 2. Xenosaga was a spiritual successor to Xenogears; development began in 2000 when enough staff had been gathered, lasting approximately two years. As with Xenogears, the game was scripted by Takahashi and Tanaka, who planned out the Xenosaga series as a hexalogy. In 2001, Namco producer Shinji Noguchi and Monolith Soft's Tadashi Nomura conceived a new IP for the GameCube unconnected to Xenosaga. Titled Baten Kaitos: Eternal Wings and the Lost Ocean, development began six months after the concept was formed, with Honne acting as director. The game development staff of the company was now divided between the Xenosaga series and Baten Kaitos, the latter a project driven by the younger developers at Monolith Soft. Baten Kaitos was co-developed with tri-Crescendo, which came about due to both submitting designs to Namco, which suggested they work together on the project. In 2003, Honne was approached by then-CEO of Nintendo Satoru Iwata about developing a new entry in the Mother series for GameCube. Honne created a pitch themed around a "felt-style recreation of 80s America", but the idea was firmly rejected by series creator Shigesato Itoi.

Following the release of the first Xenosaga game, Takahashi and Sugiura reassessed the internal structure of Monolith Soft, determining that the current lead developers were too old, clashing with their intended goals for the company to foster young talent. With this mindset, Takahashi stepped down from his lead role in the Xenosaga series. He continued to work for the company in a supervisory role by providing the series' scenario drafts, while younger staff continued the series development. This move also allowed Takahashi a greater degree of creative freedom in a number of projects as opposed to being tied to a single series. In May 2002, Monolith Soft moved from Yokohama to their current offices in Meguro, Tokyo. The next entry in the Xenosaga series, Xenosaga Episode II, began development under a new team following the release of Episode I. While developing Episode II, the staff shifted their focus from the main series to help tell the story through multiple media. Among these additional projects was Xenosaga: Pied Piper, a spin-off title for mobile devices co-developed with Tom Create and Namco Mobile. Pied Piper was Tanaka's last work on the Xenosaga series. Beginning in 2003, Monolith Soft also developed Namco × Capcom, a PlayStation 2 crossover game featuring characters from various Namco and Capcom video games. The idea was proposed by Monolith Soft, with development lasting two years.

In 2006, Monolith Soft was involved in four released games; Dirge of Cerberus: Final Fantasy VII, Xenosaga I & II, Xenosaga Episode III and Baten Kaitos Origins. Dirge of Cerberus, was primarily developed by SQUARE ENIX with Monolith Soft providing development support. Xenosaga I & II was an expanded re-imagining of the first two games for the Nintendo DS, and is notable for being Monolith Soft's first title for handheld game consoles. The game was co-developed by Tom Create in collaboration with multiple staff who had worked on the anime adaptation for the first Xenosaga. Xenosaga Episode III began development in 2004. While Xenosaga was planned as a hexalogy, the new team decided to restructure the series as a trilogy. Episode III was the last planned entry in the series, with further games depending on its commercial success. The mixed commercial and critical performance of the Xenosaga series left Monolith Soft's development staff in a state of low morale. Baten Kaitos Origins, again co-developed with tri-Crescendo, was released late in the lifespan of the GameCube shortly before the release of Nintendo's new home console the Wii. A Baten Kaitos game for the DS was also in development at Monolith Soft, but Namco, which by this point had merged with Bandai to become Namco Bandai, cancelled the project. A third Baten Kaitos game was in early development for "a long time" according to Honne, but was cancelled due to unspecified circumstances. Future efforts with the series depended upon both fan demand and the cooperation of IP owners Namco.

Nintendo era
According to Sugiura, Monolith Soft's relations with Namco had undergone a negative change after Nakamura retired as head of Namco in 2002, three years before the merger with Bandai. The company underwent changes and Monolith Soft felt they were being given less creative freedom, and the newly-created Bandai Namco was less willing to take creative risks. The company then received consultation from Shinji Hatano, an executive director at Nintendo, who advised them to continue creating innovative projects. Spurred on by Hatano's supportive attitude, Monolith Soft decided to break away from Bandai Namco to become a Nintendo subsidiary; this provided Monolith Soft creative freedom in exchange for software development exclusivity for Nintendo platforms. Nintendo's purchasing of the majority of Monolith Soft's shares from Bandai Namco Holdings was publicly announced in April 2007. Nintendo became the majority shareholder of Monolith Soft with 80% of shares, while Bandai Namco retained 16% and remained as a development partner. Namco Bandai stated that the exchange of Monolith Soft shares would strengthen their relationship with Nintendo. The remaining shares were divided between Takahashi, Sugiura and Honne. By the beginning of 2012, Namco Bandai had sold its remaining 400 shares in Monolith Soft to Nintendo, getting Nintendo 97% of the shares. Nintendo's acquisition of Monolith Soft contrasted against the company's previous publicized approach of not taking part in mergers and acquisitions of other studios and companies. In a statement on the matter, Iwata said that the deal was initiated due to the positive relations between Sugiura and Nintendo, and the two companies' parallel design and development philosophies.

Monolith Soft's first releases following its acquisition by Nintendo were Soma Bringer and Super Robot Taisen OG Saga: Endless Frontier for the Nintendo DS and Disaster: Day of Crisis for the Wii, all released in 2008. Soma Bringer was the company's first portable title to be developed entirely in-house, it was designed as an experience driven by gameplay rather than narrative. Multiple returning staff from the Xenosaga series including Takahashi and Tanaka contributed to the game. Super Robot Taisen OG Saga: Endless Frontier, a crossover RPG, was co-developed with Banpresto and featured cameo appearances from Monolith Soft's Xenosaga series. Disaster: Day of Crisis, Monolith Soft's first and to-date only non-RPG game, was intended as a showcase for the capabilities of the Wii. Due to quality concerns and Monolith Soft's unfamiliarity with the Wii hardware, it was delayed from its planned 2006 release by two years. Monolith Soft was also chosen to develop Dragon Ball Z: Attack of the Saiyans due to their pedigree at developing RPGs. During this period they assisted in the development of Super Smash Bros. Brawl.

From mid 2006, Takahashi was working on a separate project; struck by an idea of rival civilizations emerging on the frozen bodies of two warring gods, he and Honne constructed a model of the two gods to better visualize the idea. After bringing their idea to Nintendo producer Hitoshi Yamagami, the team began development in 2007. Takahashi later stated that the game's development acted as a means of boosting company morale after the failure of the Xenosaga series. The director, Koh Kojima, started his directorial debut with this game, having previously written the scenario for Baten Kaitos Origins. This game also saw a shift away from the narrative-heavy approach of Monolith Soft''s earlier work, which Takahashi stated had been called out as old-fashioned. In contrast to many earlier Monolith Soft projects, the game was designed with an international release in mind. The intended scale of the game caused problems, and Takahashi reluctantly went to Yamagami with a list of proposals to cut down the game to a suitable size as he was accustomed to doing for previous projects. Yamagami rejected all of Takahashi's suggestions, instead persuading Nintendo to keep supporting the project and allow the team to complete their work as envisioned. Originally titled Monado: Beginning of the World, Iwata had the title changed to honor Takahashi's previous work on Xenogears and the Xenosaga franchise. The new title was Xenoblade Chronicles.

2010s
Xenoblade Chronicles released in 2010 in Japan, and after multiple delays, also released worldwide to unexpected critical and commercial success. Also released that year was Super Robot Taisen OG Saga: Endless Frontier Exceed, a sequel to the original game co-developed with Banpresto that expanded upon the mechanics of the original and featured further Xenosaga cameos. In 2011, Monolith Soft founded a new studio in Kyoto, closer to Nintendo's home base so the two companies could better interact with each other. Despite some initial reservations, the staff quickly settled into their new offices and the studio became a lauded place of work. Rather than original projects, the Kyoto branch acts as a supplementary studio, providing support for Monolith Soft and on Nintendo's in-house projects. The Kyoto branch has provided support for The Legend of Zelda: Skyward Sword (2011), Animal Crossing: New Leaf (2012), Pikmin 3 (2013), The Legend of Zelda: A Link Between Worlds (2013), Splatoon, (2015), Animal Crossing: Happy Home Designer (2015), The Legend of Zelda: Breath of the Wild (2017), Splatoon 2 (2017), and Animal Crossing: New Horizons (2020).

The next game released from Monolith Soft, again in collaboration with Banpresto, was Project X Zone for the Nintendo 3DS. A successor to Namco × Capcom, the game received development support from and featured characters from franchises owned by Namco Bandai, Capcom and Sega. Following the release of Xenoblade Chronicles, Monolith Soft was also working on a follow-up titled Xenoblade Chronicles X for the Wii U. A spiritual successor to the first game, and the company's first high-definition video game title, Xenoblade Chronicles X shifted from a story-driven to an open world gameplay-driven structure. The incorporation of an extensive multiplayer element resulted in its release being delayed and the narrative being substantially altered. Monolith Soft also developed a sequel to Project X Zone, Project X Zone 2. In addition to changing the character roster selected from Sega, Capcom and Bandai Namco, the game introduced characters from the Nintendo franchise Fire Emblem in addition to characters from Xenoblade Chronicles.

During the last development stages of Xenoblade Chronicles X, Monolith Soft began work on a new Xenoblade title for the Nintendo Switch. Titled Xenoblade Chronicles 2, the game returned to the story-driven structure of Xenoblade Chronicles while building upon the gameplay and technology of Xenoblade Chronicles X. One of the game's story prototypes was later turned into an expansion titled Xenoblade Chronicles 2: Torna – The Golden Country, released in 2018. In addition to this, Monolith Soft also began development of a fantasy action game, hiring new staff for the project. The company opened new studios in Nakameguro and Iidabashi during 2017 and 2018. The 1st Production team, known for their work on the Xenoblade Chronicles series, started hiring staff for development of a new RPG project in October 2018. In March 2019, the 2nd Production team started hiring staff for a new project in The Legend of Zelda franchise. Between 2018 and 2019, the Iidabashi studio closed. In April 2019, in the wake of high revenue during the 2018–2019 fiscal period, the company opened a new studio in Ōsaki, Tokyo. In 2022 Monolith Soft released Xenoblade Chronicles 3.

Games

Lead development 
This list is for games to which Monolith Soft contributed substantially, being either a major co-developer or the main developer.

Support development 
This list is for titles where a studio of Monolith Soft acted in a lesser supporting role to the main developer. Monolith Soft Tokyo, the development branch who lead development on their Xenoblade franchise and other of their franchises, is one of the companies responsible for support in game design for Breath of the Wild titles in The Legend of Zelda franchise, while the other games have Monolith Soft Kyoto, which is only a support studio, acting as one of the support studios for art and graphics.

Philosophy
From the company's inception, Takahashi and Sugiura wanted to give creative freedom to pursue projects outside genre standards, in addition to hiring young staff. An early aim was to encourage younger developers to make their mark in the industry, which at the time was dominated by people in the late 30s and up. This outlook was the reason why younger staff were given charge of the Xenosaga series. Kojima stated that younger developers were preferred as they could bring interesting ideas to a project. According to Sugiura, a major element during the period in which Monolith Soft was under Namco was the focus on creativity. They wanted to balance this with the financial logistics of game design rather than having budgetary concerns stifle the creative flare of the staff. When talking about their Wii U projects in 2012, Monolith Soft staff member Michihiko Inaba stated that the company wanted to show that Japan could keep up with the Western market in terms of ambitious games that pushed the industry forward, comparing Monolith Soft to Bethesda Softworks in this desire.

Speaking about the move from Namco Bandai to Nintendo, Sugiura commented that it was a challenge to only be developing games for a single group of consoles. Nintendo endorsed the challenge to Monolith Soft with incentives such as making a particular game within given hardware specifications, providing the company time and resources to accomplish that. Another factor that changed within Monolith Soft's development process was Nintendo's increased quality control, which would moot any project that did not have the desired quality for their systems. This sense of challenge was also echoed by Takahashi, who described both Xenoblade Chronicles and Xenoblade Chronicles X as being defined by self-imposed challenges to the development team when creating the environments on limited gaming hardware. Monolith Soft's scope and goals are often attributed to Takahashi's drive and ambition. While commonly associated with Japanese role-playing games (JRPGs), Monolith Soft focuses more on making role-playing games for a worldwide audience.

Rather than a fixed development structure, Monolith Soft chooses to freely assign staff based on the direction a project takes, in addition to believing in collaborations with other companies on projects rather than developing entirely in-house. According to a 2012 interview with Takahashi, a prerequisite for working at Monolith Soft is a deep passion for games in addition to general knowledge outside the field. As opposed to many other Japanese and Western studios which have come under criticism for excessive overtime and poor working conditions, Monolith Soft strives for a friendly working environment and reasonable hours for its staff. Overtime is also negotiated with the management and receives payment, a rarity in Japanese business. Speaking in relation to this approach, Honne recited the company's motto; "Zero overtime and creative work allowed". Despite the gaming industry's workforce being dominated by men, Monolith Soft has a notably high proportion of female developers working at the company, with more than a quarter of its workforce in total.

Notes

References

External links
 

Video game companies established in 1999
Entertainment companies of Japan
Nintendo divisions and subsidiaries
Former Bandai Namco Holdings subsidiaries
First-party video game developers
Software companies based in Tokyo
Video game companies of Japan
Video game development companies
Japanese companies established in 1999
2007 mergers and acquisitions